Väike-Maarja Church is a church in Väike-Maarja in Lääne-Viru County, Estonia. Constructed in 1346, Väike-Maarja Church has three nave-halls in Gothic architectural style and was initially built as a fortress church.

The church's organ was installed by Gustav Normann in 1848.

In 2002, the altar painting Come to me and the stained-glass window "Let the children come to me" were restored by glass creator Riho Hütt. In 2003, Hütt created the "Hyperdulia" rose window. The churchyard includes the tombs of the noted explorers Krusensterns and the Lurich people.

The church has comparatively thick walls:  on average, and also has two embrasures close to the western-side pillar.

On August 8, 2010, a derecho destroyed the church spire. A new spire was built in 2012.

Gallery

References

External links 
 On the map visitestonia.com

Väike-Maarja Parish
Former churches in Estonia
Lutheran churches in Estonia
Tourist attractions in Lääne-Viru County
Churches completed in 1346